Maurice Pascal Alers Hankey, 1st Baron Hankey,  (1 April 1877 – 26 January 1963) was a British civil servant who gained prominence as the first Cabinet Secretary and later made the rare transition from the civil service to ministerial office. He is best known as the highly-efficient top aide to Prime Minister David Lloyd George and the War Cabinet, which directed Britain during the First World War.

In the estimation of his biographer John F. Naylor, Hankey held to the "certainties of a late Victorian imperialist, whose policies sought to maintain British domination abroad and to avoid as far as possible British entanglement within Europe. His patriotism stands inviolable, but his sensitivity to processes of historical change proved limited". Naylor found, "Hankey did not altogether grasp the virulence of fascism... except as a military threat to Britain; nor did he ever quite comprehend the changing face of domestic politics which Labour's emergence as a party of government entailed.... In these shortcomings Hankey was typical of his generation and background; that his responsibility was greater lay in the fact that he was better informed than nearly any of his contemporaries".

Personal life
The third son of R. A. Hankey, Maurice Hankey was born at Biarritz in 1877 and educated at Rugby School. He joined the Royal Marine Artillery, was promoted to captain and served in successive roles, including as coastal defence analyst in the War Division of the Naval Intelligence Department (1902–1906). His youngest brother, Donald Hankey, was a soldier best known for a series of essays that he wrote while he served on the Western Front in World War I. Donald died in action at Battle of the Somme.

Around Christmas 1902, Hankey met Adeline de Smidt. They married in September 1903. The couple had a strong and supportive relationship, with Adeline frequently accompanying him to social engagements with prominent figures, and to significant events such as the Paris Peace Conference and the Genoa Conference. They had four children: Robert (born 1905), Ursula (born 1909), Christopher (born 1911) and Henry (born 1914). A fifth child was stillborn in 1916. The Hankey family moved several times while their children were young, living in Malta for a year in 1907 before eventually settling in Highstead near Limpsfield, Surrey.

Lord Hankey died in 1963, aged 85, and was succeeded in his barony by his eldest son, Robert.

Career in government 
In 1908, Hankey was appointed Naval Assistant Secretary to the Committee of Imperial Defence. He became Secretary to the Committee in 1912, a position that he would hold for 26 years. In November 1914, he took on the additional duty of Secretary of the War Council. In that function, he took notice of the ideas of Major Ernest Swinton to build a tracked armoured vehicle and brought them to the attention of Winston Churchill on 25 December 1914. This led to the eventual creation of the Landship Committee.

In December 1916, David Lloyd George became Prime Minister and greatly changed how the government was run. A small War Cabinet was instigated, and Hankey was appointed as its Secretary and served as Secretary of the Imperial War Cabinet, which also incorporated representatives of the Colonies and Dominion governments. He gained such a reputation for strong competency that when the full Cabinet was restored in 1919, the secretariat was retained, and Hankey then served as Secretary to the Cabinet for 19 years.

In 1923, he acquired the further position of Clerk of the Privy Council. During his long tenure, he would also often serve as British Secretary to many international conferences and Secretary-General of many Imperial Conferences.

In August 1938, Hankey retired from government and became a British Government Director of the Suez Canal Company, a post that he would hold for only one year. Hankey remained a respected figure and was often consulted by ministers and civil servants for advice. In August 1939, he advised Neville Chamberlain about the formation of a new War Cabinet and, the following month, became another of Chamberlain's many non-party political appointments when he was made Minister without Portfolio and a member of the War Cabinet. Hankey was  reluctant to take on the task but agreed to do so. He became Chancellor of the Duchy of Lancaster when Chamberlain was succeeded by Winston Churchill in May 1940 but was left out of Churchill's War Cabinet.

In July 1941, Lord Hankey was moved to the position of Paymaster-General, but the following year, he was dropped from the Government altogether. He continued to hold other positions in both the public and private sector until his death.

Post-war writings
After World War II, Hankey emerged as a leading critic of the war crimes trials, and in his 1950 book Politics, Trials and Errors, he argued that the Allies had no right to convict German and Japanese leaders of war crimes. Hankey kept a series of at times startlingly-detailed handwritten diaries throughout most of his years in government, including during his time as Secretary to the War Council and Imperial War Cabinet of the First World War. The diaries are currently held at the Churchill Archives Centre in Cambridge, England, and can be read by the public.

Honours
In the 1912 Birthday Honours, Hankey was appointed to the Order of the Bath as a Companion. He was then promoted within the same order as a Knight Commander in 1916 and as a Knight Grand Cross in 1919. In the 1929 Birthday Honours, Sir Maurice was appointed to the Order of St Michael and St George as a Knight Grand Cross. In the 1934 New Year Honours, Sir Maurice was appointed to the Royal Victorian Order as a Knight Grand Cross.

In the 1939 New Year Honours, he was raised to the peerage as Baron Hankey, of The Chart in the County of Surrey. The same year, he was also appointed to the Privy Council. In 1942, he was elected to the Royal Society as a Fellow under Statute 12 for those "who have rendered conspicuous service to the cause of science, or are such that election would be of signal benefit to the Society".

References

Sources

External links 
 Spartacus Educational article 
 The Papers of Lord Hankey and The Papers of Lady Hankey, both held at Churchill Archives Centre

|-

|-

 

1877 births
1963 deaths
Cabinet Secretaries (United Kingdom)
Clerks of the Privy Council
Chancellors of the Duchy of Lancaster
Members of the Privy Council of the United Kingdom
Knights Grand Cross of the Order of the Bath
Knights Grand Cross of the Order of St Michael and St George
Knights Grand Cross of the Royal Victorian Order
Royal Marines officers
Fellows of the Royal Society (Statute 12)
British expatriates in France
Ministers in the Churchill wartime government, 1940–1945
Ministers in the Chamberlain wartime government, 1939–1940
1
Barons created by George VI